The Women's World Cup could refer to any of:

FIFA Women's World Cup (association football)
UCI Women's Road World Cup (cycling)
Women's Cricket World Cup
Women's Cricket T20 World Cup
Women's Rugby World Cup (rugby union)
Women's Rugby League World Cup
Women's World Cup of Golf
Bandy World Cup Women
Women's FIH Hockey World Cup (field hockey)